Rakesh Kumar (born 15 April 1983) is a former Indian professional Kabaddi player and Coach of Harayana Steelers. He was the vice-captain of the Indian team that won the gold medal at the 2007 World Cup at Panvel, India. In 2011, in recognition of his achievements in the sport, he was awarded the Arjuna Award by the Government of India.

Early life 
Rakesh Kumar was born on 15 April 1983, in the Nizampur village of North West Delhi. He took up Kabaddi in 1997 during his school days. After having played for his school team, he represented Delhi at the national level, before making it to the senior national team in 2003.

Career 
Rakesh Kumar made his debut for the national team in 2003. In addition to winning medals at the national level, he was a part of the national team that won gold medals at the World Cups in 2004, 2007. With the team, he also won gold medals at the Asian Games in 2006, 2010 and 2014, South Asian Games in 2006 and 2010, and the Asian Indoor Games in 2007, 2009 and 2013.

Pro Kabaddi League
He was made the captain of the team who led the team to a third-place finish in the 2014 season.
He was signed by U Mumba for the 2016 season. Then for the 2017 season, he was swapped to Telugu Titans.

Currently, he is the head coach of Haryana Steelers.

References

External links 
 Rakesh Kumar profile at ProKabaddi

People from North West Delhi district
Living people
Sportspeople from Delhi
Indian kabaddi players
1982 births
Asian Games medalists in kabaddi
Kabaddi players at the 2006 Asian Games
Kabaddi players at the 2010 Asian Games
Kabaddi players at the 2014 Asian Games
Pro Kabaddi League players
Asian Games gold medalists for India
Medalists at the 2006 Asian Games
Medalists at the 2010 Asian Games
Medalists at the 2014 Asian Games
South Asian Games gold medalists for India
South Asian Games medalists in kabaddi
Recipients of the Arjuna Award
Fear Factor: Khatron Ke Khiladi participants